The 2019 season of competitive association football in Indonesia.

Promotion and relegation

National teams

Men's national football team

2022 FIFA World Cup and 2023 AFC Asian Cup qualification

Men's under-23 football team

2019 AFF U-22 Youth Championship

2020 AFC U-23 Championship qualification

2019 Southeast Asian Games

Men's under-19 football team

2019 AFF U-18 Youth Championship

2020 AFC U-19 Championship qualification

Men's under-16 football team

2019 AFF U-15 Boys' Championship

2020 AFC U-16 Championship qualification

Women's national football team

2020 AFC Women's Olympic Qualifying Tournament (second round)

2019 AFF Women's Championship

2019 Southeast Asian Games

League season

Liga 1

Liga 2 

First round

Second round

Knockout round

Final

Liga 3 

First Round

Second Round

Third Round

Final

Liga 1 Putri 

Group stage

Knockout stage

Domestic Cups

Piala Indonesia 

Finals

AFC Competitions

AFC Champions League

Qualifying play-offs

Preliminary round 1

Preliminary round 2

AFC Cup

Group stage

Group G

Group H

Knockout stage

Zonal semi-finals

Notes

References